Adda Djørup (born August 18, 1972) is a Danish poet, novelist and short story writer.

Biography
Djørup was born in Aarhus, Denmark. She went to the Katrinebjergskolen (Katrinebjerg school) before dropping out and working for several years as an au pair, before returning for secondary school. She gained a BA in Comparative Literature from the University of Copenhagen.

Djørup lives in Copenhagen.

Career
Djørup's first book was Monsieurs monologer, a collection of poetry, appeared in 2005.

In 2007, she published a collection of short stories, titled Hvis man begyndte at spørge sig selv. Several of the stories in the collection were set in southern Europe. Djørup revealed that these were informed by her own extensive sojourn in Spain and Italy.

Djørup's novel Den mindste modstand (The least resistance, 2009) won the EU Prize for Literature in 2010.

In 2011, Djørup wrote a drama, titled Korus’ Kabaret.

In 2015, she released a poetry collection titled Poesi og andre former for trods.

Awards
 2010, EU Prize for Literature.

References

21st-century Danish novelists
Danish women poets
1972 births
Living people
21st-century Danish poets
21st-century Danish women writers
Danish women novelists